CVM Secondary School is a private school in Bhaktapur District, Nepal. CVM stands for "Charkhandi Vidhya Mandir". The school was founded in 1997, (2054 VS) in Sirutar. This is 'A' graded school in Gatthaghar, Madhyapur Thimi, Bhaktapur, with well qualified faculties, healthy and social environment, adequate infrastructure and transportation.

External links

Schools in Nepal
Bhaktapur
1997 establishments in Nepal